Ansainiai (formerly) is a village in Kėdainiai district municipality, in Kaunas County, in central Lithuania. According to the 2011 census, the village had a population of 14 people. There is a memorial for exiled local inhabitants during the Soviet era.

History

In the beginning of the 20th century, Ansainiai (Hanusewicze) was an okolica, a property of the Butkevičiai, Dautartai, Gineikiai, Hanusaučiai, Ivanaičiai, Jagėlavičiai, Jusevičiai, Kšešanavičiai, Stecevičiai, Uginskiai, Vencevičiai families.

Demography

References

Villages in Kaunas County
Kėdainiai District Municipality